Nathan Hale (June 6, 1755 – September 22, 1776) was an American Patriot, soldier and spy for the Continental Army during the American Revolutionary War. He volunteered for an intelligence-gathering mission in New York City but was captured by the British and executed. Hale is considered an American hero and in 1985 was officially designated the state hero of Connecticut.

Early life and family
Nathan Hale was born in Coventry, Connecticut, in 1755, to Deacon Richard Hale and Elizabeth Strong, a descendant of Elder John Strong. He was a great-grandson of Reverend John Hale, an important figure in the Salem witch trials of 1692. He was also the grand-uncle of Edward Everett Hale, a Unitarian minister, writer, and activist noted for social causes including abolitionism. He was the uncle of journalist Nathan Hale, who founded the Boston Daily Advertiser and helped establish the North American Review.

In 1769, when Nathan Hale was fourteen years old, he was sent with his brother Enoch, who was sixteen, to Yale College. He was a classmate of fellow Patriot spy Benjamin Tallmadge. The Hale brothers belonged to the Linonian Society of Yale, which debated topics in astronomy, mathematics, literature, and the ethics of slavery. Nathan graduated with first-class honors in 1773 at age 18 and became a teacher, first in East Haddam and later in New London.

American Revolutionary War
After the Revolutionary War began in 1775, Hale joined a Connecticut militia unit and was elected first lieutenant within five months. His company participated in the Siege of Boston, but Hale remained behind. It has been suggested that he was unsure as to whether he wanted to fight, or possibly that he was hindered because his teaching contract in New London did not expire until several months later, in July 1775. On July 4, 1775, Hale received a letter from his classmate and friend Benjamin Tallmadge, who had gone to Boston to see the siege for himself. He wrote to Hale, "Was I in your condition, I think the more extensive service would be my choice. Our holy Religion, the honor of our God, a glorious country, & a happy constitution is what we have to defend." Tallmadge's letter was so inspiring that, several days later, Hale accepted a commission as first lieutenant in the 7th Connecticut Regiment under Colonel Charles Webb of Stamford.

Hale was also a part of Knowlton's Rangers, the first organized intelligence service organization of the United States of America, led by Lieutenant Colonel Thomas Knowlton. In the spring of 1776, the Continental Army moved to Manhattan to defend New York City against the anticipated British attack. In August, the British soundly defeated the Continentals in the Battle of Long Island via a flanking move from Staten Island across Brooklyn. General George Washington was desperate to determine the location of the imminent British invasion of Manhattan; to that end, Washington called for a spy behind enemy lines, and Hale was the only volunteer.

Intelligence-gathering mission
Hale volunteered on September 8, 1776, to go behind enemy lines and report on British troop movements, which he knew was an act of spying, punishable by death. He was ferried across the Long Island Sound to Huntington, New York, on British-controlled Long Island, on September 12. Hale planned to disguise himself as a Dutch schoolteacher looking for work, though he did not travel under an assumed name and reportedly carried with him his Yale diploma bearing his real name.

While Hale was undercover, New York City (then the area at the southern tip of Manhattan, mostly south of what is now Chambers Street) fell to British forces on September 15, and Washington was forced to retreat to the island's north in Harlem Heights (what is now Morningside Heights). Shortly after, on September 21, a quarter of the lower portion of Manhattan burned in the Great New York Fire of 1776. The fire was later widely thought to have been started by American saboteurs in order to keep the city from falling into British hands, and though setting fire to New York during Washington's retreat had indeed been proposed, Washington and the Congress had rejected the idea and denied responsibility. The Americans accused British soldiers of starting the fires without orders from their superiors so they could sack the city. In the fire's aftermath, more than 200 American Patriots were detained by the British for questioning.

An account of Hale's capture, later obtained by the Library of Congress, was written by Consider Tiffany, a Connecticut shopkeeper and Loyalist. In Tiffany's account, Major Robert Rogers of the Queen's Rangers saw Hale in a tavern and recognized him. After luring Hale into betraying his allegiance by pretending to be a Patriot himself, Rogers and his Rangers apprehended Hale near Flushing Bay in Queens, New York. Another story is that Hale's cousin, a Loyalist named Samuel Hale, was the one who revealed his true identity.

British General William Howe had established his headquarters in the Beekman House in a then-rural part of Manhattan, on a rise between what are now 50th and 51st Streets between First and Second Avenues, near where Beekman Place commemorates the connection. Hale reportedly was questioned by Howe, and physical evidence was found on him. Rogers provided information about the case. According to some accounts, Hale spent the night in a greenhouse at the mansion, while others say he spent it in a bedroom there. He requested a Bible; his request was denied. Sometime later, he requested a clergyman. Again, the request was denied. General Howe did permit him to write letters: one to his brother Enoch and other to his commanding officer, but the next day, they were torn up in front of him by the provost marshal, Captain Cunningham.

Death and purported last words

According to the standards of the time, spies were hanged as illegal combatants. By all accounts, Hale comported himself well before the hanging.  Frederick MacKensie, a British officer, wrote this diary entry for the day:

On the morning of September 22, 1776, Hale was marched along Post Road to the Park of Artillery, which was next to a public house called the Dove Tavern (at modern-day 66th Street and Third Avenue), and hanged. He was 21 years old.

No official records were kept of Hale's final speech. It has traditionally been reported that his last words, either entirely or in part, were: "I only regret that I have but one life to lose for my country." The account of the quote originated with British Captain John Montresor, who was present at the hanging. The next day, he spoke with American Captain William Hull under a flag of truce. Hull recorded in his memoirs the following quote by Montresor:

Because Hull was not an eyewitness to Hale's speech, some historians have questioned the reliability of this account.

Over the years, there has been a great deal of speculation as to whether or not Hale specifically uttered this line, or some variant of it.  If Hale did not originate the statement, it is possible he instead repeated a passage from Joseph Addison's play Cato, which was widely popular at the time and an ideological inspiration to many Whigs:

It is almost certain that Hale's last speech was longer than one sentence. Several early accounts mention different things he said. These are not necessarily contradictory, but rather, together they give an idea of what the speech might have been like. The following quotes are all taken from George Dudley Seymour's book, Documentary Life of Nathan Hale, published in 1941 by the author. Enoch Hale, Nathan's brother, wrote in his diary after he questioned people who had been present, October 26, 1776, "When at the Gallows he spoke & told them that he was a Capt in the Cont Army by name Nathan Hale." The February 13, 1777, issue of the Essex Journal stated, "However, at the gallows, he made a sensible and spirited speech; among other things, told them they were shedding the blood of the innocent, and that if he had ten thousand lives, he would lay them all down, if called to it, in defence of his injured, bleeding Country." The May 17, 1781, issue of the Independent Chronicle and the Universal Advertiser gave the following version: "I am so satisfied with the cause in which I have engaged, that my only regret is, that I have not more lives than one to offer in its service."

Aside from the site at 66th Street and Third Avenue, two other sites in Manhattan claim to be the hanging site:
 City Hall Park, where a statue of Hale designed by Frederick William MacMonnies was erected in 1890
 Inside Grand Central Terminal

The Yale Club bears a plaque hung by the Daughters of the American Revolution which states the event occurred "near" the Club.  Yale is Hale's alma mater and the Club is at 44th Street and Vanderbilt Avenue, mere feet from Grand Central Terminal. Another account places Hale's execution at Bergen Beach, Brooklyn, but there is no evidence to support this claim.

Hale's body was never found. His family erected an empty grave cenotaph in Nathan Hale Cemetery in South Coventry Historic District, Connecticut.

Legacy

Statues and appearance

Statues of Hale are based on idealized archetypes; no contemporaneous portraits of him have been found. Documents and letters reveal Hale was an informed, practical, detail-oriented man who planned ahead. Of his appearance and demeanor, fellow soldier Lieutenant Elisha Bostwick wrote that Hale had blue eyes, flaxen blond hair, darker eyebrows, and stood slightly taller than the average height of the time, with mental powers of a sedate mind and piousness. Bostwick wrote:

Hale has been honored with two standing images:
 A statue designed by Frederick William MacMonnies was dedicated on the anniversary of Evacuation Day, November 25, 1893, at City Hall Park, New York. The statue established Hale's modern idealized square-jawed image. A copy of MacMonnies's statue stands in Williams Park in New London, Connecticut.
 A statue of Hale, sculpted 1908–1912 by Bela Pratt, was cast in 1912 and stands in front of Connecticut Hall, where Hale resided while at Yale. Copies of this sculpture stand at the Phillips Academy in Andover, Massachusetts; the Nathan Hale Homestead in Coventry; the Connecticut Governor's Residence in Hartford, Connecticut; Fort Nathan Hale in New Haven, Connecticut; Mitchell College in New London, Connecticut; the Department of Justice in Washington, D.C.; Tribune Tower in Chicago; and at the headquarters of the Central Intelligence Agency in Langley, Virginia.

Other statues/markers include:
 A statue of Hale with an inscription of his reported last words on the first floor of the Connecticut State Capitol in Hartford. Statues of Hale are also located in the Tulane University Law School reading room, and at the corner of Summit and Portland Avenues in Saint Paul, Minnesota.
 A memorial for him located in Huntington, New York, where he landed for his fatal spying mission.
 A historical marker in Freese Park, Norwalk, Connecticut, that is denoted as the embarkation point.
 A  obelisk known as the Captain Nathan Hale Monument was erected in his honor in 1846 in his birthplace of Coventry, Connecticut.
In January 1899 a play based on Hale's life, Nathan Hale by Clyde Fitch opened at New York's Knickerbocker Theatre, where it played successfully for eight weeks. It then toured for more than a year, with 41-year-old Nat Goodwin playing Hale and Goodwin's wife Maxine Elliott playing Alice Adams.

Namesake items

 The hamlet of Halesite, New York (formerly Huntington Harbor) on Long Island is named after Hale. There is a memorial plaque set into a large boulder, which was removed from the beach nearby where Hale is thought to have landed on his fateful mission.
 Nathan Hale Army Depot, a U.S. Army installation, is located in Darmstadt, Germany.
 Fort Nathan Hale, a Revolutionary War-era fort and historic site in New Haven, Connecticut, is named after him.
 The Nathan Hale Inn and Nathan Hale dormitory on the University of Connecticut campus in Storrs, Connecticut, are named after Hale.
 The Nathan Hale dormitory, traditionally a freshman girls' dorm, at Phillips Academy in Andover, Massachusetts, is named after Hale.
 The Nathan Hale Center at Robert Morris University, dedicated in 1971, is a classroom building located on campus.
 Nathan Hale Hall is a building at Farmingdale State College in Farmingdale, New York, which is home to Biology and Art Centers.
 Nathan Hale Hall is a barracks building at Fort George G. Meade, Maryland.
 Nathan Hale Hall is the main academic building at Mitchell College in New London, Connecticut.
 The Nathan Hale Memorial Chapter of the Daughters of the American Revolution was organized June 6, 1900, in East Haddam, Connecticut. The ceremony took place at the one-room schoolhouse where he once taught.
 High schools named after Hale include Nathan Hale-Ray High School in East Haddam, Connecticut (where he was schoolmaster), Nathan Hale High School in Seattle, Washington, and high schools in West Allis, Wisconsin, and Tulsa, Oklahoma.
 Middle schools named after Hale include Nathan Hale-Ray Middle School in East Haddam, Connecticut; Nathan Hale Middle School in Norwalk, Connecticut (the departure point for his final mission); and Captain Nathan Hale Middle School in Coventry, Connecticut (his birthplace); as well as middle schools in Northvale, New Jersey; Omaha, Nebraska; Cleveland, Ohio; and Crestwood, Illinois.
 There are elementary schools named after Hale in Roxbury, Boston; New London, Connecticut; Enfield, Connecticut; Manchester, Connecticut; Meriden, Connecticut; New Haven, Connecticut; Whiting, Indiana; Schaumburg, Illinois; Lansing, Illinois; Crestwood, Illinois; Chicago, Illinois; Carteret, New Jersey; Northvale, New Jersey; Mesa, Arizona; and Minneapolis, Minnesota.
 The United States Navy submarine USS Nathan Hale (SSBN-623) was named in his honor.
 The Nathan Hale Ancient Fife and Drum Corps from Coventry, Connecticut, is named after him and includes a division called Knowlton's Connecticut Rangers.
 "Nathaniel Hale" Battalion is the name of the Battalion for Army ROTC based at the University of Connecticut, with Knowlton Company (Company A) at the University of Connecticut and Sillman Company (Company B) at Sacred Heart University.
 Campsite Nathan Hale at Baiting Hollow Scout Camp, Baiting Hollow, New York.

Ballads
Two early ballads attempt to recreate Hale's last speech. Songs and Ballads of the Revolution (1855), collected by F. Moore, contained the "Ballad of Nathan Hale" (anonymous), dated 1776: "Thou pale king of terrors, thou life's gloomy foe, Go frighten the slave; go frighten the slave; Tell tyrants, to you their allegiance they owe. No fears for the brave; no fears for the brave."; and "To the Memory of Capt. Nathan Hale", by Eneas Munson Sr., was written soon after Hale's death:

Munson had tutored Hale before college, and knew him and his family well, so even though the particulars of this speech may be unlikely, Munson knew first-hand what Hale's opinions were.

See also
 Intelligence in the American Revolutionary War
 Intelligence operations in the American Revolutionary War
 Nathan Hale Homestead
 Kusunoki Masashigea Japanese samurai, also famous for his last words before execution
 Daniel Hale, a descendant equally tried for espionage

References

Citations

Sources

Further reading
 Baker, Mark Allen. "Spies of Revolutionary Connecticut, From Benedict Arnold to Nathan Hale." Charleston: The History Press, 2014. 
 Circian. "The Story of Nathan Hale." Archiving Early America. N.p., 2011. Web. October 3, 2011. A Time for Heroes: The Story of Nathan Hale.
 Fleming, Thomas. "George Washington, Spymaster." American Heritage. American Heritage Publishing Company, 2011. Web. October 3, 2011. George Washington, Spymaster.
 Durante, Dianne, Outdoor Monuments of Manhattan: A Historical Guide (New York University Press, 2007): description of MacMonnies's Nathan Hale at City Hall Park, New York.
 
 Miller, Tom. "The Lost 1763 Beekman Mansion 'Mount Pleasant'50th Street and 1st Avenue." Daytonian in Manhattan. n.p., September 21, 2011. Web. October 3, 2011. Daytonian in Manhattan: The Lost 1763 Beekman Mansion "Mount Pleasant" – 50th Street and 1st Avenue.
 Ortner, Mary J. "Captain Nathan Hale." The Connecticut Society of the Sons of the American Revolution. n.p., 2010. Web. October 3, 2011. Captain Nathan Hale.
 Phelps, William M. "Nathan Hale: The Life and Death of America's First Spy" St. Martin's Press, New York. 2008. 
 Rose, Alexander.  Washington's Spies:  The Story of America's First Spy Ring. Random House, New York. 2006.  .

External links

 A Time for Heroes: The Story of Nathan Hale
 
 
 
 
 
 A radio drama about his spy mission is available as the "Nathan Hale Story", a presentation from Destination Freedom

 
1755 births
1776 deaths
American Revolutionary War executions
Continental Army officers from Connecticut
Executed spies
People executed by the British military by hanging
People of Connecticut in the American Revolution
People from Coventry, Connecticut
United States Army Rangers
Yale College alumni
Yale University alumni
Executed people from Connecticut
People executed by the Kingdom of Great Britain
Symbols of Connecticut
Military personnel from Connecticut
American spies during the American Revolution